Bayerlein is a surname. Notable people with the surname include:
 Bernhard H. Bayerlein (1949), German professor
 Fritz Bayerlein (1899–1970), German lieutenant general

See also 
 Bayer (surname)
 Beyer
 Baier
 Beier

German-language surnames